The Green River Ordnance Plant, also known as the Green River Arsenal, was a large munitions factory complex between Dixon and Amboy in Lee County, Illinois.

History
It was rapidly constructed in 1942 and just as quickly shut down in 1945. Stewart-Warner Corporation operated the complex to produce rocket-propelled bazooka ammunition, artillery shells, naval shells, bombs, rifle grenades, fuses and rockets for use during World War II. 

It lies on the south side of U.S. Highway 30.

See also
Rock Island Arsenal
Joliet Army Ammunition Plant
Sangamon Ordnance Plant
Lake City Army Ammunition Plant

External links
Illinois EPA Article
Ammunition Online Store
Lincoln Highway Pictures

Buildings and structures in Lee County, Illinois
Ammunition manufacturers
United States Army arsenals
United States Army arsenals during World War II
Military installations in Illinois